Bogoslof Island or Agasagook Island is the summit of a submarine stratovolcano at the south edge of the Bering Sea,  northwest of Unalaska Island of the Aleutian Island chain. The island is believed to be relatively new, with the volcano being entirely below sea level before 1796, and most of the presently 300 acre island being formed by eruptions since 1900.

History
The first known emergence of the island above sea level was recorded during an underwater eruption in 1796. Since then, parts of the island have been successively added and eroded. On the southwest side of Bogoslof, another dome erupted in 1796; it is now called Castle Rock. Other eruptions have occurred in 1796–1804, 1806–1823, 1883–1895, 1906, 1907, 1909–1910, 1926–1928, 1992, and 2016–2017. The island is a breeding site for seabirds, seals, and sea lions. An estimated 90,000 tufted puffins, guillemots, red-legged kittiwakes and gulls nest here.

In 1909, President Theodore Roosevelt designated Bogoslof and Fire Island, a sanctuary for sea lions and nesting marine birds. Together, as the Bogoslof Wilderness, they are currently part of the Aleutian Islands unit of Alaska Maritime National Wildlife Refuge. In November 1967, Bogoslof Island was designated a National Natural Landmark by the National Park Service. The Bogoslof Island group was added to the National Wilderness Preservation System in 1970.

2016–2017 Eruptions

20 December 2016: A series of short nearly-daily volcanic eruptions started, producing towering volcanic ash clouds and volcanic lightning, changing the geography of the island. As there are no cameras or monitoring stations on the island and the area is usually overcast, details were uncertain. However, when the weather became favorable, it was seen that a small vent slightly offshore of Bogoslof's northeast beach had erupted explosively, fracturing the original island in two, and forming a new, smaller island to the northeast.
02:08 UTC on 20 February (17:08 AKST on 19 February): A significant explosive eruption began at Bogoslof volcano. Seismic and infrasound data showed a series of short-lived explosive pulses through 02:45 UTC; seismicity decreased slightly since then. Recent satellite images show a cloud as high as 25,000 ft asl.
10 May 2017: Bogoslof was estimated to have an area of about 319 acres or 1.3 square kilometers.
17 May 2017: An eruption sent ash 34,000 feet into the atmosphere.
28 May 2017: Another eruption sent ash as high as 35,000 feet and raised Aviation Color Code to red, its highest level.  Ash that rises above 20,000 feet is a threat to airliners in the area  The National Weather Service Alaska Aviation Weather Unit also issued an alert that the ash cloud may climb as high as 50,000 feet.
30 August 2017: An eruption occurred, with slight volcanic activity continuing into early December, after which the volcano appeared to return to relative inactivity.

Gallery

See also
Bogoslof Wilderness
List of National Natural Landmarks
List of volcanoes in the United States of America

References

External links

Volcanoes of the Alaska Peninsula and Aleutian Islands-Selected Photographs
Bogoslof Island: Block 1069, Census Tract 1, Aleutians West Census Area, Alaska United States Census Bureau

Active volcanoes
Islands of the Aleutian Islands
Islands of Aleutians West Census Area, Alaska
National Natural Landmarks in Alaska
Submarine volcanoes
Volcanoes of Alaska
Volcanoes of the Aleutian Islands
New islands
Uninhabited islands of Alaska
Volcanoes of Unorganized Borough, Alaska
Stratovolcanoes of the United States
Islands of Alaska
Islands of Unorganized Borough, Alaska